Maidul Islam is a Jatiya Party (Ershad) politician and the former Member of Parliament of Barisal-4.

Career
Islam was elected to parliament from Barisal-4 as a Jatiya Party candidate in 1986 and 1988.

References

Jatiya Party politicians
Living people
3rd Jatiya Sangsad members
4th Jatiya Sangsad members
Year of birth missing (living people)